The Who's Tommy Pinball Wizard is a pinball machine based on the rock musical The Who's Tommy.  The machine features twenty-one songs from the musical sung by original Broadway cast members. The game was designed by Joe Kaminkow, Ed Cebula, Lonnie D. Ropp, and Lyman F. Sheats Jr. The machine was built using Solid-state electronics type components. The backbox of the machine has a dot matrix display with animations by Kurt Andersen and Markus Rothkranz. 4,700 machines were manufactured by Data East in January 1994.

Gameplay 
There are three skill shot bonuses possible on the launch of each new ball. Two of which award increasing point values, and the third initiates a multiball if lit. The main game modes of the table are accessed by lighting the entire Union Jack on the playfield’s center. There are 12 mini-games in this mode based on various scenes and scores from the musical. Completing these 12 modes unlocks the Pinball Wizard multiball of six balls By lighting the letters to spell T-O-M-M-Y then hitting one of two scoops. Depending on which scoop activates the multiball, the player is given either 3 or 4 balls. This mode has multiple subsequent stages, each awarding greater point values as jackpots.

Storyline 
The separate Game modes follow the plot of the musical. The musical consists of two acts and a total of twenty scenes, with the highlights of those scenes replicated with dot matrix animations on the backglass of the machine during the twelve Union Jack modes as well as Tommy Mode.

Features 
The music for the machine consists of stage adaptations from the original Rock opera Tommy, composed by Pete Townshend of The Who. There are 21 songs total programmed to play throughout gameplay and for various stages and modes. Songs include Overture, Captain Walker, It's a Boy, Sparks, Christmas, See Me Feel Me, Smash the Mirror, Fiddle About, Cousin Kevin, Sensation, The Acid Queen, Pinball Wizard, Listening To You and Sally Simpson. To launch each ball, the player can use either an automatic launch by pressing a flipper button while a ball is in the alley, or manually via the spring plunger assembly. The machine includes an automated silver disc that rotates to cover the flipper portion of the machine to emulate playing pinball as the title character. This mode occurs during each multiball sequence, or for the entire duration of the game by player selection of the Tommy game mode. The owner/operator may program a feature that allows the player to exchange credits for extra ball(s) to continue the game where it left off.

Other version
Data East was one of few regular pinball company that manufactured custom pinball games e.g. for the movie Richie Rich. This pinball machine was based on The Who's Tommy Pinball Wizard machine. 10 pre-production prototypes were also made for promotional use in conjunction with the off-Broadway productions. These prototypes had six pop bumpers were as the production version only has 3. The game made its debut at the Hard Rock Cafe in Dallas in October of 1993, one of these games fell off the truck and was destroyed. Another was used in the 1993 Macy's Thanksgiving Day Parade, this special machine was rigged for "autoplay" and had no backbox, electronics were cabinet-mounted. Reportedly, these prototypes may have had EM chime units.

In popular culture
The machine appears, anachronistically, in Further Tales of the City, in a scene set in a gay bar. The miniseries is set in 1981 — thirteen years before the release of The Who's Tommy Pinball Wizard.

References

External links

Data East pinball machines
1994 pinball machines
Pinball machines based on works
Tommy (rock opera)